Plymouth is a village on the north-west coast of the island of Tobago, Trinidad and Tobago. It was first settled by Courlanders.

References

Populated places in Tobago
Villages in Trinidad and Tobago